Il padrone sono me is a 1955 Italian comedy-drama film. It marked the directorial debut of Franco Brusati. The film premiered at the 16th Venice International Film Festival.

Cast 
Paolo Stoppa: Mingon
Andreina Pagnani: Miss Maria 
Myriam Bru: Dolly
Pierre Bertin: Robertino 
Leopoldo Trieste: Professor Edoardo 
Jacques Chabassol  
Daniela Rocca 
Giuseppe Addobbati 
Guido Celano
Lina Gennari

References

External links

1955 films
Films directed by Franco Brusati
Italian comedy-drama films
1955 comedy-drama films
Italian black-and-white films
1950s Italian films